Farma 1 — Bude to drsné (English: The Farm 1) is the Slovak version of The Farm reality television show based on the Swedish television series of the same name. The show filmed in May–June 2011 and premiered on July 23, 2011 on Markíza.

Format
Ten contestants are cut out from outside world. Each week one contestant is selected the Farmer of the Week. In the first week, the contestants choose the Farmer. Since week 2, the Farmer is chosen by the contestant evicted in the previous week.

Nomination Process
The Farmer of the Week nominates two people (a man and a woman) as the Butlers. The others must decide, which Butler is the first to go to the Battle. That person than choose the second person (from the same sex) for the Battle and also the type of battle (a quiz, tug-of-war, cutting wood). The Battle winner must win one duel. The Battle loser is evicted from the game. In the live final 9 September 2011 Andrea Járová won 50 000 € . Lenka Liptáková finish on the second place. Michal Kováčik won title Favorit Farmer.

Contestants

Future appearances
Miloš Ferleťák returned to Farma for Farma: All-Stars and placing 4th.

Nominations

The game

External links
http://farma.markiza.sk
 Farma Markíza - fanpage 

The Farm (franchise)
2011 Slovak television seasons